Hosnies Spring formerly Hosnie's Spring or Hosnies Springs) is a wetland on Christmas Island, an Australian external territory in the eastern Indian Ocean.  It has been recognised as being of international importance by designation under the Ramsar Convention on Wetlands.

History
Hosnies Spring was known earlier but the unique ecosystem was noted in late 1980s. It was incorporated into the Christmas Island National Park in 1989, and listed on 11 December 1990 as Ramsar site 512, one of two such sites on the island and the smallest in the world. In 2010 a proposal was made to increase the area of the Ramsar site to 202 ha. Justification for its Ramsar designation is because it:
 is an example of a type of unusual wetland unique to Christmas Island;
 supports a unique assemblage of flora locally restricted to the one location, and additionally several endemic and vulnerable species;
 is of special value for locally restricted species as well as several endemics.

Although some restricted phosphate mining occurs nearby, human activity has had little impact on the site.

Description
The small, 3,300 m2 site comprises permanent freshwater streams and seepages emerging from the base of a cliff on an uplifted marine terrace about 24–37 m asl and 120 m inland from the seaward cliff.

Flora and fauna
The springs form a wetland supporting a unique 120,000-year-old stand of the mangroves Bruguiera gymnorhiza and Bruguiera sexangula.  The stand contains between 300 and 600 trees, including some of the largest Bruguiera ever recorded, several with trunks of more than 80 cm diameter and with a canopy 30–40 m high. Several species of birds and crabs endemic to the island occur on the site.

References

Notes

Sources
 
 
 

Ramsar sites in Australia
Geography of Christmas Island